Lena Andersson may refer to:

Lena Andersson (author) (born 1970), Swedish author
Lena Andersson (singer) (born 1955), Swedish singer
Lena Andersson (speed skater, born 1954), Swedish speed skater
Lena Andersson (speed skater, born 1961), Swedish speed skater